Pachypoda is a genus of central American capsid bugs in the subfamily Bryocorinae and the tribe Eccritotarsini, erected by Carvalho & China in 1951.

Species
GBIF includes:
 Pachypoda chiamborazensis Carvalho, 1990
 Pachypoda costaricensis Carvalho, 1990
 Pachypoda guatemalensis Carvalho & China, 1951
 Pachypoda major Carvalho, 1985
 Pachypoda mundula (Stal, 1862)
 Pachypoda sordida Carvalho & China, 1951
 Pachypoda turrialba Carvalho, 1985
 Pachypoda vultuosa (Distant, 1893)

References

External links
 

Miridae